Sowans or sowens, also called virpa in Shetland, is a Scottish dish made using the starch remaining on the inner husks of oats after milling. The husks are allowed to soak in water and ferment for a few days. The liquor is strained off and allowed to stand for a day to allow the starchy matter therein to settle. The liquid part, or swats, is poured off and can be drunk. The remaining sowans are boiled with water and salt until thickened, then served with butter or dipped into milk. The flavour is distinctly sour.

See also

 Brochan Lom
 List of porridges

References

Scottish cuisine
Porridges
Fermented foods
Oat-based dishes